Tom Hudson (born 8 November 1994) is an English rugby union player who currently plays for Ampthill in the RFU Championship on loan from Gloucester in the Premiership Rugby.

References

External links
ESPN Profile
Its Rugby Profile

1994 births
Living people
English rugby union players
Gloucester Rugby players
Rugby union players from Newcastle upon Tyne
Ampthill RUFC players
Rugby union centres